Dalian University of Foreign Languages (DLUFL) is a public university in Dalian, Liaoning, China and one of the top foreign language institutes in China. Formerly known as Dalian School of Japanese Language, DLUFL was founded in 1964 with the help of the late Chinese Premier Zhou Enlai. It is now under the administration of the Education Commission of Liaoning Province. Through 40 years of development, DLUFL has fledged into a multi-disciplinary foreign language university which also offers programs in other fields like arts, economics, management, engineering and law.

Campus
In 2007, the university moved its main campus to Lüshunkou District, formerly known as Port Arthur, which, due to its enviable military harbor, was once the major theater for the Russo-Japanese war during 1904-1905. Lüshunkou or Lüshun／Lvshun, along with its twin sister city Dalian, was also part of the former colony of the Empire of Japan, with Lvshun hosting the headquarters of the Japanese Kwangtung Army.

The University's old campus in downtown Dalian remained until 2013, when the School of Chinese Studies was also moved to Lüshunkou District. The Lüshun Campus boasts scenic views, spanning over 1,260,000 square meters (311 acres), with a building area of 500,000 square meters (123 acres).

Facility
The library of the university holds 765,000 copies of books and 600,000 electronic books with the electronic reading rooms.

Location
 Lüshunkou District, Dalian, No.6 Lüshun South Road

History
With the help of the late Chinese Premier Zhou Enlai, DLUFL was founded in 1964 to teach Japanese language, and in the 1970s, the English school and the Russian school were established. Other language departments were then established to meet the needs of Economic reform in China that began in 1978. In the mid-1980s, the university was authorized by Ministry of Education of the People's Republic of China to offer postgraduate programs.

Administration

Faculty
Among the 1,000 faculty and staff, 300 hold Professor or Associate Professor titles. Ten prominent professors receive the Special Allowances from the State Council.

Programmes
DLUFL offers 20 bachelor programs, among which 10 lead to master programs. The 20 bachelor programs include Japanese, English, Russian, French, Korean, German, Spanish, Arabic, Portuguese, Italian, Chinese, Chinese Literature, Teaching Chinese as a Second language, Art Design, Tourism Management, International Economics & Trade, Computer Science & Technology, Information Management and Information Systems, Computer Software Engineering, Journalism and Music Studies are named key disciplines at the provincial level.

Language Training and Testing Centers
DLUFL administers over 20 language tests such as TOEFL, GRE, HSK, JLPT, BJT, KLPT, and WSK.

Notable alumni
Liu Xiaoming, former Chinese Ambassador to the United Kingdom.
Chen Naiqing, former Chinese Ambassador to Norway; wife of former Chinese ambassador to the United States Zhang Yesui .
Yu Shayan, Deputy Governor of Heilongjiang Province, China.

References

 
Universities and colleges in Dalian
Language education in China
Educational institutions established in 1964
1964 establishments in China